Boubacar Diallo (born 22 November 1954) is a Senegalese sprinter. He competed in the men's 100 metres at the 1980 Summer Olympics.

International competitions

References

1954 births
Living people
Athletes (track and field) at the 1980 Summer Olympics
Athletes (track and field) at the 1984 Summer Olympics
Senegalese male sprinters
Olympic athletes of Senegal
Place of birth missing (living people)